The 2000 World Club Challenge was contested by 1999 NRL season premiers, the Melbourne Storm and 1999's Super League IV champions, St. Helens. The match was played on 22 January at JJB Stadium, Wigan before a crowd of 13,394. The Melbourne Storm defeated St Helens 44 - 6. This was the first World Club Challenge since 1997 and the Super League war.

Background

St Helens

The 1999 Super League Grand Final was the conclusive and championship-deciding game of the Super League IV season. The match was played between English clubs St. Helens and Bradford Bulls on Saturday 9 October 1999, at Old Trafford, Manchester, UK.

Melbourne Storm

The 1999 NRL Grand Final was the conclusive and premiership-deciding game of the 1999 NRL season. It was contested by the competition's two newest clubs: the Melbourne Storm, competing in only its second year (having finished the regular season in 3rd place); and the St George Illawarra Dragons, in their first year as a joint-venture club (having finished the regular season in 6th place), after both sides eliminated the rest of the top eight during the finals.

A new rugby league world record crowd of 107,999 was at Stadium Australia for the game. The attendance, which saw 67,142 more people attend than had done so for the 1998 NRL Grand Final at the Sydney Football Stadium, broke the record attendance for a Grand Final, eclipsing the previous record of 78,065 set in 1965. After trailing 0-14 at half time, the Melbourne Storm defeated the St George Illawarra Dragons 20-18.

Venue
With the game set to be played in England, the Rugby Football League chose Wigan's home venue, the JJB Stadium which could hold 25,333, as the host venue in preference to St Helens' home ground of Knowsley Road which could only hold 17,500.

Teams

Match details

References

World Club Challenge
Melbourne Storm matches
St Helens R.F.C. matches
World Club Challenge
World Club Challenge
World Club Challenge